The 2013-14 Turkish Women's Basketball League is the 34th edition of the top-flight professional women's basketball league in Turkey.

Fenerbahçe are the defending champions.

Regular season

League table

Play-off 

Source: Turkish Women Basketball League

References 

2013-14
Women
Turkey